Eugene Guth (August 21, 1905 – July 5, 1990) was a Hungarian American physicist who made contributions to polymer physics and to nuclear and solid state physics. He was awarded a Ph.D. in Theoretical Physics by the University of Vienna in 1928. He was a postdoctoral research associate with Wolfgang Pauli at the Austrian-German Science Foundation, Federal Institute of Technology (ETH) Zurich and University of Leipzig, with Werner Heisenberg from 1930 to 1931.  He was Professor at the University of Vienna (1932–1937) and the University of Notre Dame 1937-1955. He was at Oak Ridge National Laboratory from 1955 to 1971.

Discoveries
He is noted for several pioneering discoveries that advanced the field of polymer physics, which was recognised by the award of the Bingham Medal for rheology in 1965. These included the treatment of the flexible, randomly kinked molecule in Brownian motion of polymers; the explanation of the entropic origin of the elastic force; and the Kinetic Theory of Rubber Elasticity.

Aside from establishing the first polymer physics laboratory at an academic institution in America,  
Dr. Guth had an international reputation in physics and polymer science. In 1976, he delivered the first plenary lecture on "Birth and Rise of Polymer Science - Myth and Truth," before the International Symposium on Applied Polymer Science. Two years later, he received the University of Vienna's Distinguished Alumnus Award, and in 1979, he was awarded the Honor Cross of Science and Arts by President Rudolf Kirchschläger of the Republic of Austria. He remained interested in science throughout his entire life.  His last article was published posthumously in 1991 in the Journal of Polymer Science Part B.

Legacy
A book, co-edited by his long-time friend and colleague Professor J. E. (Jim) Mark of the University of Cincinnati, was intended to celebrate Eugene Guth's 85th birthday, but subsequently was published as a memorial.  The book is entitled "Elastomeric Polymer Networks", Prentice Hall Publishers, 1992, . The oval picture to the right is found in the inside preface to that collected papers volume.

References

External links
 Homepage of Dr. Eugene Guth

1905 births
1990 deaths
20th-century American physicists
American nuclear physicists
Polymer scientists and engineers
Rheologists
Oak Ridge National Laboratory people
University of Notre Dame faculty
Academic staff of the University of Vienna
Fellows of the American Physical Society
Austrian emigrants to the United States